Varixanthone is an antimicrobial made by the marine fungus Emericella variecolor.

References

Trichocomaceae
Formate esters
Oxygen heterocycles
Heterocyclic compounds with 4 rings